The Nurse Practitioner: The American Journal of Primary Healthcare is a peer-reviewed nursing journal covering the practice of nurse practitioners. It is abstracted and indexed in Index Medicus/Medline/PubMed.

References

External links 
 

English-language journals
Lippincott Williams & Wilkins academic journals
General nursing journals
Monthly journals
Publications established in 1975